Dirk van Hogendorp is the name of:
Dirk van Hogendorp (1761–1822), colonial administrator
Dirk van Hogendorp (1797–1845), nephew of the above, jurist